is a run and gun arcade game released by Sega in 1989 and ported to the Sega Mega Drive/Genesis in 1990 in Japan and 1991 in North America by Sage's Creation. It was also ported and released to a number of home computer platforms by U.S. Gold.

The Mega Drive version of Crack Down was re-released on the Wii Virtual Console in Japan on August 7, 2007 and in PAL regions on September 7, 2007. It also released on Steam on June 1, 2010.

Gameplay

Using a top-down perspective (akin to Gauntlet), the player controls either Ben or Andy, a pair of agents charged with stopping mad scientist Mr. X (Mr.K in the Sega Mega Drive version) from taking over the world, as they make their way through several timed levels, planting bombs and destroying cyborg enemies using guns (the "machine gun" and the "cannon" can be swapped back and forth) and smart bombs (which wipe out all enemies on screen.)  The goal of each stage is to plant all of the bombs and escape before their collective timer goes off.

Reception 

In Japan, Game Machine listed Crack Down on their May 15, 1989 issue as being the third most popular arcade game during the previous two weeks. Console XS gave a review score of 82%.  They praised the detailed graphics and felt the gameplay was very addictive and praised the 2 player mode saying it’s double the fun.  They concluded saying it’s worth playing. MegaTech gave the genesis version a review score of 65%. They praised Crack Down saying it’s enjoyable to play and praised the two player mode calling it fun.  They criticized the game’s lack of challenge.

References

External links
Official Virtual Console website 

1989 video games
Amiga games
Amstrad CPC games
Arcade video games
Atari ST games
Commodore 64 games
Cooperative video games
Sega arcade games
Sega video games
Sega Genesis games
U.S. Gold games
Video games scored by Yasuhiro Kawakami
Virtual Console games
ZX Spectrum games
Video games developed in Japan